The 1994 World Figure Skating Championships were held at the Makuhari Messe Arena in Chiba, Japan from March 20 to 27. Medals were awarded in men's singles, ladies' singles, pair skating, and ice dancing.

Medal tables

Medalists

Medals by country

Results

Men

Ladies

Following the ladies event, Surya Bonaly, the silver medalist protested her second place finish during the medal ceremony. First, by refusing to stand on the podium and then she stripped her medal off of her neck after being presented it.

Pairs

Ice dancing

External links
 results

World Figure Skating Championships
World Figure Skating Championships
World Figure Skating Championships
World Figure Skating Championships, 1994
International figure skating competitions hosted by Japan
World Figure Skating Championships
World Figure Skating Championships, 1994